Dhadkan may refer to:

 Dhadkan (1946 film), a 1946 Bollywood film
 Dhakhan (2000 film), a 2000 Indian romantic drama film
 Dhadkan (2017 film), a 2017 Indian Bhojpuri action-romance-comedy film
 Dhadkan (TV series), an Indian medical drama

See also
Dharkan, 1972 Indian film
 Dharkan (TV series), 2016 Pakistani television series